The Dakota Territory Air Museum is an aviation museum on North Hill in Minot, North Dakota near Minot International Airport. The mission of the Dakota Territory Air Museum is to be a historical aviation resource honoring the men, women and machines that have impacted the rich history of aviation through displays and events that educate, inspire and entertain people of all ages. The museum consists of a main information room, outdoor displays, a restoration hangar, the Scott Nelson Gallery, the Texas Flying Legends hangar, Wright Flyer Hangar and the Oswin H. Elker Hangar.

History
The museum was founded in 1986 and the first museum building was built in 1988. Additions were added in 1990 and 1991. A new hangar, for the aircraft from the Texas Flying Legends Museum, was built in 2013.

The museum has held an annual sweepstakes since 1997 in which it gives away a light airplane.

In a cooperative venture with the Texas Flying Legends Museum in Houston, each spring, the collection of World War II warbirds is flown from Texas to the Dakota Territory Air Museum where they are typically on display from mid-May through July.

Since 2014, the museum has hosted the Magic City Discovery Center, a children's museum, while it searches for a permanent location.

Collection
This is a partial list of airplanes on display at the museum.  Displays change often as planes do go to air shows or other museums occasionally.

Military

 Convair QF-106A Delta Dart
 Douglas C-47A Skytrain
 Lockheed T-33A
 LTV A-7 Corsair II
 McDonnell Douglas F-15A Eagle

Owned by the Texas Flying Legends Museum

 Canadian Car and Foundry Harvard IV
 Curtiss P-40E Warhawk
 Curtiss P-40 Warhawk – under restoration to static display
 Douglas C-53 Skytrooper
 General Motors FM-2 Wildcat
 Interstate L-6 Cadet
 North American B-25J Mitchell Betty’s Dream
 North American P-51C Mustang Lopes Hope 3rd
 North American P-51D Mustang Little Horse
 North American P-51D Mustang Dakota Kid II
 Supermarine Spitfire IXc Half Stork
 Goodyear FG-1D Corsair Whistling Death

Civilian

 Aeronca 7 Champion
 Arrow Model F
 Arrow Sport
 Beechcraft Expeditor 3NM
 Callair A-3
 Cessna 170
 Cessna 185
 Cessna 195
 Cessna T-50
 Christen Eagle II
 Curtiss Model D – replica
 Erco Ercoupe
 Evans VP-1 Volksplane
 Fairchild 24 C8C
 Garnet Even
 Hall Cherokee II
 Kaminskas Jungster I
 Learjet 24B
 Luscombe 8A
 Monocoupe 110
 Monocoupe 110 Special
 Mooney M20
 Piel Emeraude
 Pietenpol Aircamper
 Piper J-3 Cub
 Piper J-3 Cub
 RLU-1 Breezy
 Rotec Rally 2B
 RotorWay Exec
 Rutan VariEze
 Schweizer SGS 1-36 Sprite
 Stinson SR-5A Reliant
 Stolp Starduster Too
 Taylor J-2
 Taylorcraft BC-12D
 Taylorcraft GJ
 Wright Flyer – replica
 Waco GXE
 Waco QCF-2
 Waco UPF-7
 Waco VPF-7
 Wolf W-11 Boredom Fighter

See also 
 American Wings Air Museum
 Fagen Fighters WWII Museum
 Fargo Air Museum
 Wings of the North Air Museum

References

External links
 
 March/April Dakota Territory Air Museum P-47 Update – AirCorps Aviation

Museums in Minot, North Dakota
Aerospace museums in North Dakota